Credit One Bank, N.A. is an American bank and financial services company specializing in credit cards, particularly for borrowers with low credit scores. It is a wholly-owned subsidiary of Credit One Financial, incorporated in Nevada. Credit One Financial is an S corporation that is affiliated with Sherman Financial Group through common beneficial ownership. Despite the similar names and "nearly identical" logos, Credit One is not affiliated with the much larger Capital One.

History
Credit One Bank began operations as a full-service bank under the name First National Bank of Marin (FNBM) in San Rafael, California, on July 30, 1984. FNBM maintained a wide range of products until 1995 when it began focusing primarily on two types of products, partially and fully secured credit cards. FNBM received a limited purpose designation from the Office of the Comptroller of the Currency (OCC), a bureau of the United States Department of the Treasury, in June 1996. Limited purpose banks offer only a narrow product line. The bank moved from San Rafael, California, to Las Vegas, Nevada, in November 1998. FNBM obtained its CEBA status in March 2005 and subsequently changed its name to Credit One Bank, N.A. on February 1, 2006.

In 2018, Credit One Bank moved its headquarters to a new facility. In 2021, the bank expanded its headquarters.

Sponsorships
Credit One Bank started sponsoring Chip Ganassi Racing in 2016. In 2017, Jamie McMurray drove a Credit One Bank No. 1 car for four races. The next year, the bank changed its sponsorship to Kyle Larson, who drove a sponsored No. 42 car in eight Monster Energy Cup events and two NASCAR Xfinity Series events. After Target’s departure from NASCAR after 2017, Credit One Bank became Larson's primary sponsor for the No. 42 Chevrolet starting the following season. Since 2016, Credit One Bank has been sponsoring the broadcast of the white flag lap of most NASCAR races.

In 2017, Credit One Bank became a sponsor of the National Hockey League's Vegas Golden Knights in their inaugural season.

In 2019, Credit One Bank became a founding partner with Minor League Baseball's Las Vegas Aviators, a Triple-A affiliate of the Oakland Athletics. Credit One Bank is also a sponsor of the Las Vegas Raiders.

Credit One Bank sponsored a 2020 women's tennis tournament, The Credit One Bank Invitational.

Criticism 

The Better Business Bureau's profile for Credit One Bank includes an alert reading, "BBB files indicate that this business has a pattern of complaints concerning billing/collection issues. Complainants allege that this Credit One Bank charges consumers, sometimes repeatedly, without authorization, which may include late or unexplained fees. Complainants also allege that Credit One Bank forwards incorrect information to credit reporting agencies such as Equifax, Experian and TransUnion."

The Motley Fool gave a one-star (out of five) review to Credit One Bank's credit card. The review praised the bank for making the card available to customers with poor credit and for offering cash-back incentives, while criticizing the card's complicated application process and high fees.

On June 9, 2022, The Wall Street Journal reported: "A bankruptcy judge found Credit One Bank liable to roughly 288,000 credit-card customers, saying the bank lied about turning over all its documents."

The Wall Street Journal reported that the Sherman Financial Group, Credit One's parent company, increased its litigation activity against customers with delinquent accounts during the COVID-19 pandemic at a time when many other financial companies had decreased theirs.

The Credit One Bank logo and the Capital One logo both have an arcing "swoosh" above their names. This has led to some confusion among consumers. Credit One Bank adopted their black and blue logo in 2006 after they changed their name, and Capital One adopted their blue and red logo in 2008. Capital One's subsequent $13 billion marketing campaign led to a large number of new customers for both itself and Credit One, some of whom were unaware that the two were different companies.

References

External links 
 

Banks based in Nevada
Banks established in 1984
Companies based in Paradise, Nevada